Massimo Castagna (born 12 October 1961) is an Italian volleyball player. He competed in the men's tournament at the 1988 Summer Olympics.

References

1961 births
Living people
Italian men's volleyball players
Olympic volleyball players of Italy
Volleyball players at the 1988 Summer Olympics
Sportspeople from Catania